The 2022 Birmingham Stallions season was the first season for the Birmingham Stallions as a professional American football franchise. They play as charter members of the United States Football League, one of eight teams to compete in the league for the 2022 season. The Stallions play their home games at Protective Stadium and Legion Field and are led by head coach Skip Holtz.

In week 8, the Stallions clinched the South division.

Background and history
As is the case with all eight teams competing in the league, the Birmingham Stallions take their name and color scheme from a franchise of the same name that competed in the original USFL. The original Birmingham Stallions, who competed in the USFL from 1983 to 1985, finished at or above .500 in each of their three seasons and were led by head coach Rollie Dotsch for the duration of their existence.

The identical team names were the subject of a lawsuit brought to Fox by the owners of the original USFL, who claimed trademark infringement and false advertising on the part of the new league.

Personnel

Final roster

The Stallions, like all other teams, have a 38-man active roster with a 7-man practice squad. Their first picks in the 2022 USFL Draft included quarterback Alex McGough (round 1, pick 6), defensive end Aaron Adeoye (round 2, pick 11), and offensive tackle Chauncy Haney (round 3, pick 22).

Staff
The Stallions' first head coach and general manager is Skip Holtz, who will also lead Birmingham's offense. Holtz, who served in various positions on college coaching staffs from 1987 to 2021, served most recently in head coaching positions at East Carolina, South Florida, and Louisiana Tech. After finishing the 2021 season at Louisiana Tech with a record of 3–9, he was fired. The Stallions' defense will be led by John Chavis, whose most recent coaching positions include defensive coordinator spots at Tennessee, LSU, Texas A&M, and Arkansas.

Schedule
The Stallions' 2022 schedule was announced on March 7. They opened the season against the New Jersey Generals in the league's inaugural game, which did simulcast by both NBC and Fox, with an additional broadcast on NBC's Peacock streaming service. This was the first simulcast of a live sporting event by rival television networks since 1967. Because the regular season is being held in its entirety at Protective Stadium and Legion Field in Birmingham, Alabama, the Stallions will play all of their games at their home stadium. The schedule format has each team playing a ten-game regular season, consisting of two games against each division opponent and one game against each team in the opposite division.

Note: Intra-division opponents are in bold text. * mean that they host the game, since all eight teams play at the same stadium

Game summaries

Week 1: vs. New Jersey Generals

The Stallions started their first season in the inaugural opener for the USFL against the New Jersey Generals. The Stallions won the coin toss and elected to defer. The Generals scored on their first drive to put the Stallions down 0–7.  The Stallions answered with a 35 yard touchdown pass to Osirus Mitchell to tie the game 7–7. The rest of the quarter saw the teams trade punts. The Generals scored the only points of the second quarter with a touchdown after an Alex McGough interception, putting the Stallions behind 7–14. The Stallions then scored the only points of the third quarter with a C. J. Marable 3-yard rush, tying the game 14–14. In the fourth quarter the Generals scored first, putting the Stallions down 14–21. The Stallions would respond with a 6 play 67 yard touchdown, tying it up again at 21–21. The Generals responded with a 38 yard field goal drive, ending in a 47 yard field goal, putting the Stallions at 21–24 with 1:54 remaining. The Stallions responded by driving 59 yards downfield for a touchdown that would give them their first lead at 28–24, which would be the final score.

Week 2: at Houston Gamblers

For a second time in as many weeks, Stallions quarterback J'Mar Smith led Birmingham to three consecutive second half drives that ended with touchdowns. The reigning USFL Offensive Player of the Week, Smith went 19-of-29 for 214 yards on Saturday. His 34-yard, third quarter touchdown pass to Osirus Mitchell gave the Stallions a 19–18 lead. His 64-yard strike to Marlon Williams stretched Birmingham's lead to 33–21 with just over 13 minutes left.

Houston, who took an 18–13 halftime lead on the strength of Will Likely's 63-yard pick-six, made it a one-possession game when Clayton Thorson connected with Tyler Simmons for a 44-yard touchdown with 12:24 left. The Gamblers comeback bid came up short, however, when Lorenzo Burns recorded his second pick of Thorson with 1:13 left.

Week 3: at New Orleans Breakers

The 2–0 Stallions played against division rival, the 2–0 New Orleans Breakers. In what started off as a slow offensive performance for both sides, the Stallions got a 7–0 lead on a J'Mar Smith screen pass to Marlon Williams. Later into the 2nd quarter, the Breakers scored on a 10 yard pass from Kyle Sloter to Johnnie Dixon which made the Stallions lead trim down to 7–6. With 7 seconds left in the half, Brandon Aubrey made a 33-yard field goal to give Birmingham a 10–6 lead at the half.

Coming out of the half, the Breakers conducted an 8:50 17 play drive to regain the lead at 13–10 on an 11 yard pass from Sloter to Dixon. This would be the last time the Breakers would score all game. Birmingham would score 12 points in the final quarter of play. A touchdown from Smith to Victor Bolden Jr, a safety forced by Dondrea Tillman, and a Brandon Aubrey field goal. Birmingham would end up winning 22–13, which put them in sole possession of first place in the South Division with a 3–0 record.

Standings

Postseason

References

Birmingham
2022 in sports in Alabama
Birmingham Stallions (2022)